The list of birds of Alaska includes every wild bird species recorded in the U.S. state of Alaska, based on the list published by the Alaska Checklist Committee. As of January 2022, there were 534 species on the official list. Of them, 55 are considered rare, 149 are casual, and 79 are accidental, all as defined below. Another 18 and a species pair are considered unsubstantiated. One species is endemic to the state. One species has been added as a result of a split enacted in June 2021.

Only birds that are considered to have established, self-sustaining, wild populations in Alaska are included on this list. This means that birds that are considered probable escapees, although they may have been sighted flying free in Alaska, are not included. Species which the Checklist Committee considers to depend entirely on human feeding, such as rock pigeon, are also not included.

This list is presented in the taxonomic sequence of the Check-list of North and Middle American Birds, 7th edition through the 62nd Supplement, published by the American Ornithological Society (AOS). Common and scientific names are also those of the Check-list, except that the common names of families are from the Clements taxonomy because the AOS list does not include them.

The following codes and definitions (except En) are used by the Alaska Checklist Committee to annotate some species:

(R) = Rare - "Annual or possibly annual in small numbers; most such species occur at the perimeter of Alaska, in season; a few are scarce residents"
(C) = Casual - "Not annual; these species are beyond the periphery of annual range, but recur in Alaska at irregular intervals, usually in seasonal and regional patterns"
(A) = Accidental - "One or two Alaska records, or none in the last 30 years"
(U) = Unsubstantiated - "attributed to Alaska without specimen or photo substantiation"
(En) = Endemic - A species found only in Alaska (except as a vagrant elsewhere)

Ducks, geese, and waterfowl

Order: AnseriformesFamily: Anatidae

The family Anatidae includes the ducks and most duck-like waterfowl, such as geese and swans. These birds are adapted to an aquatic existence with webbed feet, bills which are flattened to a greater or lesser extent, and feathers that are excellent at shedding water due to special oils.

Emperor goose, Anser canagica
Snow goose, Anser caerulescens
Ross's goose, Anser rossii (C)
Greater white-fronted goose, Anser albifrons
Lesser white-fronted goose, Anser erythropus (C)
Taiga bean-goose, Anser fabalis (C)
Tundra bean-goose, Anser serrirostris (C)
Brant, Branta bernicla
Cackling goose, Branta hutchinsii
Canada goose, Branta canadensis
Trumpeter swan, Cygnus buccinator
Tundra swan, Cygnus columbianus
Whooper swan, Cygnus cygnus (R)
Wood duck, Aix sponsa (R)
Baikal teal, Sibirionetta formosa (C)
Garganey, Spatula querquedula (C)
Blue-winged teal, Spatula discors
Cinnamon teal, Spatula cyanoptera (R)
Northern shoveler, Spatula clypeata
Gadwall, Mareca strepera
Falcated duck, Mareca falcata (C)
Eurasian wigeon, Mareca penelope
American wigeon, Mareca americana
Eastern spot-billed duck, Anas zonorhyncha (C)
Mallard, Anas platyrhynchos
American black duck, Anas rubripes (A)
Northern pintail, Anas acuta
Green-winged teal, Anas crecca
Canvasback, Aythya valisineria
Redhead, Aythya americana
Common pochard, Aythya ferina (C)
Ring-necked duck, Aythya collaris
Tufted duck, Aythya fuligula (R)
Greater scaup, Aythya marila
Lesser scaup, Aythya affinis
Steller's eider, Polysticta stelleri
Spectacled eider, Somateria fischeri
King eider, Somateria spectabilis
Common eider, Somateria mollissima
Harlequin duck, Histrionicus histrionicus
Surf scoter, Melanitta perspicillata
White-winged scoter, Melanitta deglandi
Stejneger's scoter, Melanitta stejnegeri (C)
Black scoter, Melanitta americana
Long-tailed duck, Clangula hyemalis
Bufflehead, Bucephala albeola
Common goldeneye, Bucephala clangula
Barrow's goldeneye, Bucephala islandica
Smew, Mergellus albellus (R)
Hooded merganser, Lophodytes cucullatus
Common merganser, Mergus merganser
Red-breasted merganser, Mergus serrator
Ruddy duck, Oxyura jamaicensis (R)

Grouse, pheasants, and allies
Order: GalliformesFamily: Phasianidae

Phasianidae consists of the pheasants and their allies. These are terrestrial species, variable in size but generally plump with broad relatively short wings. Many species are gamebirds or have been domesticated as a food source for humans.

Ruffed grouse, Bonasa umbellus
Spruce grouse, Canachites canadensis
Willow ptarmigan, Lagopus lagopus
Rock ptarmigan, Lagopus muta
White-tailed ptarmigan, Lagopus leucurus
Sooty grouse, Dendragapus fuliginosus
Sharp-tailed grouse, Tympanuchus phasianellus

Grebes
Order: PodicipediformesFamily: Podicipedidae

Grebes are small to medium-large freshwater diving birds. They have lobed toes and are excellent swimmers and divers. However, they have their feet placed far back on the body, making them quite ungainly on land.

Pied-billed grebe, Podilymbus podiceps (R)
Horned grebe, Podiceps auritus
Red-necked grebe, Podiceps grisegena
Eared grebe, Podiceps nigricollis (C)
Western grebe, Aechmorphorus occidentalis
Clark’s grebe, Aechmophorus clarkii (U)

Pigeons and doves
Order: ColumbiformesFamily: Columbidae

Pigeons and doves are stout-bodied birds with short necks and short slender bills with a fleshy cere.

Band-tailed pigeon, Patagioenas fasciata (R)
Oriental turtle-dove, Streptopelia orientalis (C)
Eurasian collared-dove, Streptopelia decaocto (Introduced to North America)
White-winged dove, Zenaida asiatica (C)
Mourning dove, Zenaida macroura (R)

Cuckoos
Order: CuculiformesFamily: Cuculidae

The family Cuculidae includes cuckoos, roadrunners, and anis. These birds are of variable size with slender bodies, long tails, and strong legs. The Old World cuckoos are brood parasites.

Common cuckoo, Cuculus canorus (C)
Oriental cuckoo, Cuculus optatus (C)
Yellow-billed cuckoo, Coccyzus americanus (C)

Nightjars and allies
Order: CaprimulgiformesFamily: Caprimulgidae

Goatsuckers (nightjars) are medium-sized nocturnal birds that usually nest on the ground. They have long wings, short legs, and very short bills. Most have small feet, of little use for walking, and long pointed wings. Their soft plumage is cryptically colored to resemble bark or leaves.

Lesser nighthawk, Chordeiles acutipennis (A)
Common nighthawk,  Chordeiles minor (R)
Eastern whip-poor-will, Antrostomus vociferus (A)
Gray nightjar, Caprimulgus jotaka (A)

Swifts
Order: ApodiformesFamily: Apodidae

The swifts are small birds which spend the majority of their lives flying. These birds have very short legs and never settle voluntarily on the ground, perching instead only on vertical surfaces. Many swifts have very long, swept-back wings which resemble a crescent or boomerang.

Black swift, Cypseloides niger
Chimney swift, Chaetura pelagica (A)
Vaux's swift, Chaetura vauxi
White-throated needletail, Hirundapus caudacutus (C)
Common swift, Apus apus (C)
Fork-tailed swift, Apus pacificus (C)

Hummingbirds
Order: ApodiformesFamily: Trochilidae

Hummingbirds are small birds capable of hovering in mid-air due to the rapid flapping of their wings. They are the only birds that can fly backwards.

Ruby-throated hummingbird, Archilochus colubris (C)
Anna's hummingbird, Calypte anna
Costa's hummingbird, Calypte costae (C)
Calliope hummingbird, Selasphorus calliope (C)
Rufous hummingbird, Selasphorus rufus

Rails, gallinules, and coots

Order: GruiformesFamily: Rallidae

Rallidae is a large family of small to medium-sized birds which includes the rails, crakes, coots, and gallinules. The most typical family members occupy dense vegetation in damp environments near lakes, swamps, or rivers. In general they are shy and secretive birds, making them difficult to observe. Most species have strong legs and long toes which are well adapted to soft uneven surfaces. They tend to have short, rounded wings and tend to be weak fliers.

Virginia rail, Rallus limicola (C)
Sora, Porzana carolina (R)
Baillon's crake, Porzana pusilla (U) (This species is not on the AOS Check-list; moreover, it is assigned to genus Zapornia by the Clements taxonomy.)
Common moorhen, Gallinula chloropus (A)
Eurasian coot. Fulica atra (A)
American coot, Fulica americana (R)
Yellow rail, Coturnicops noveboracensis (U)

Cranes
Order: GruiformesFamily: Gruidae

Cranes are large, long-legged, and long-necked birds. Unlike the similar-looking but unrelated herons, cranes fly with necks outstretched, not pulled back. Most have elaborate and noisy courting displays or "dances".

Sandhill crane, Antigone canadensis
Common crane, Grus grus (A)
Hooded crane, Grus monacha (A)

Stilts and avocets
Order: CharadriiformesFamily: Recurvirostridae

Recurvirostridae is a family of large wading birds which includes the avocets and stilts. The avocets have long legs and long up-curved bills. The stilts have extremely long legs and long, thin, straight bills.

Black-winged stilt, Himantopus himantopus (C)
American avocet, Recurvirostra americana (C)

Oystercatchers
Order: CharadriiformesFamily: Haematopodidae

The oystercatchers are large, obvious, and noisy plover-like birds, with strong bills used for smashing or prising open molluscs.

Eurasian Oystercatcher, Haematopus ostralegus (A)
Black oystercatcher, Haematopus bachmani

Lapwings and plovers

Order: CharadriiformesFamily: Charadriidae

The family Charadriidae includes the plovers, dotterels, and lapwings. They are small to medium-sized birds with compact bodies, short thick necks, and long, usually pointed, wings. They are found in open country worldwide, mostly in habitats near water.

Northern lapwing, Vanellus vanellus (A)
Black-bellied plover, Pluvialis squatarola
European golden-plover, Pluvialis apricaria (C)
American golden-plover, Pluvialis dominica
Pacific golden-plover, Pluvialis fulva
Eurasian dotterel, Charadrius morinellus (C)
Killdeer, Charadrius vociferus
Common ringed plover, Charadrius hiaticula (R)
Semipalmated plover, Charadrius semipalmatus
Little ringed plover, Charadrius dubius (C)
Lesser sand-plover, Charadrius mongolus (R)
Snowy plover, Charadrius nivosus (A)

Sandpipers and allies
Order: CharadriiformesFamily: Scolopacidae

Scolopacidae is a large diverse family of small to medium-sized shorebirds including the sandpipers, curlews, godwits, shanks, tattlers, woodcocks, snipes, dowitchers, and phalaropes. The majority of these species eat small invertebrates picked out of the mud or soil. Different lengths of legs and bills enable multiple species to feed in the same habitat, particularly on the coast, without direct competition for food.

Upland sandpiper, Bartramia longicauda
Bristle-thighed curlew, Numenius tahitiensis
Whimbrel, Numenius phaeopus
Little curlew, Numenius minutus (A)
Eskimo curlew, Numenius borealis (A) (Not seen since 1886)
Long-billed curlew, Numenius americanus (C)
Far Eastern curlew, Numenius madagascariensis (C)
Bar-tailed godwit, Limosa lapponica
Black-tailed godwit, Limosa limosa (C)
Hudsonian godwit, Limosa haemastica
Marbled godwit, Limosa fedoa
Ruddy turnstone, Arenaria interpres
Black turnstone, Arenaria melanocephala
Great knot, Calidris tenuirostris (C)
Red knot, Calidris canutus
Surfbird, Calidris virgata
Ruff, Calidris pugnax (R)
Broad-billed sandpiper, Calidris falcinellus (C)
Sharp-tailed sandpiper, Calidris acuminata
Stilt sandpiper, Calidris himantopus
Curlew sandpiper, Calidris ferruginea (C)
Temminck's stint, Calidris temminckii (C)
Long-toed stint, Calidris subminuta (R)
Spoon-billed sandpiper. Calidris pygmea (C)
Red-necked stint, Calidris ruficollis
Sanderling, Calidris alba
Dunlin, Calidris alpina
Rock sandpiper, Calidris ptilocnemis
Purple sandpiper. Calidris maritima (A)
Baird's sandpiper, Calidris bairdii
Little stint, Calidris minuta (C)
Least sandpiper, Calidris minutilla
White-rumped sandpiper, Calidris fuscicollis (R)
Buff-breasted sandpiper, Calidris subruficollis
Pectoral sandpiper, Calidris melanotos
Semipalmated sandpiper, Calidris pusilla
Western sandpiper, Calidris mauri
Short-billed dowitcher, Limnodromus griseus
Long-billed dowitcher, Limnodromus scolopaceus
Jack snipe, Lymnocryptes minimus (C)
Solitary snipe, Gallinago solitaria (C)
Pin-tailed snipe, Gallinago stenura (C)
Common snipe, Gallinago gallinago
Wilson's snipe, Gallinago delicata
Terek sandpiper, Xenus cinereus (C)
Common sandpiper, Actitis hypoleucos (R)
Spotted sandpiper, Actitis macularia
Green sandpiper, Tringa ochropus (C)
Solitary sandpiper, Tringa solitaria
Gray-tailed tattler, Tringa brevipes
Wandering tattler, Tringa incana
Lesser yellowlegs, Tringa flavipes
Willet, Tringa semipalmata (C)
Spotted redshank, Tringa erythropus (C)
Common greenshank, Tringa nebularia (R)
Greater yellowlegs, Tringa melanoleuca
Wood sandpiper, Tringa glareola
Marsh sandpiper, Tringa stagnatilis (C)
Wilson's phalarope, Phalaropus tricolor (R)
Red-necked phalarope, Phalaropus lobatus
Red phalarope, Phalaropus fulicarius

Pratincoles and coursers
Order: CharadriiformesFamily: Glareolidae

Pratincoles have short legs, very long pointed wings, and long forked tails. Their most unusual feature for birds classed as waders is that they typically hunt their insect prey on the wing like swallows, although they can also feed on the ground. Their short bills are an adaptation to aerial feeding.

Oriental pratincole, Glareola maldivarum (A)

Skuas and jaegers
Order: CharadriiformesFamily: Stercorariidae

Jaegers and skuas are in general medium to large birds, typically with gray or brown plumage, often with white markings on the wings. They have longish bills with hooked tips and webbed feet with sharp claws. They look like large dark gulls, but have a fleshy cere above the upper mandible. They are strong, acrobatic fliers.

South polar skua, Stercorarius maccormicki (C)
Pomarine jaeger, Stercorarius pomarinus
Parasitic jaeger, Stercorarius parasiticus
Long-tailed jaeger, Stercorarius longicaudus

Auks, murres, and puffins
Order: CharadriiformesFamily: Alcidae

The family Alcidae includes auks, murres, and puffins. These are short-winged birds that live on the open sea and normally only come ashore for breeding.

Dovekie, Alle alle (R)
Common murre, Uria aalge
Thick-billed murre, Uria lomvia
Black guillemot, Cepphus grylle
Pigeon guillemot, Cepphus columba
Long-billed murrelet, Brachyramphus perdix (C)
Marbled murrelet, Brachyramphus marmoratus
Kittlitz's murrelet, Brachyramphus brevirostris
Ancient murrelet, Synthliboarmphus antiquus
Cassin's auklet, Ptychoramphus aleuticus
Parakeet auklet, Aethia psittacula
Least auklet, Aethia pusilla
Whiskered auklet, Aethia pygmaea
Crested auklet, Aethia cristatella
Rhinoceros auklet, Cerorhinca monocerata
Horned puffin, Fratercula corniculata
Tufted puffin, Fratercula cirrhata

Gulls, terns, and skimmers

Order: CharadriiformesFamily: Laridae

Laridae is a family of medium to large seabirds and includes gulls, terns, kittiwakes, and skimmers. They are typically gray or white, often with black markings on the head or wings. They have stout, longish bills and webbed feet.

Black-legged kittiwake, Rissa tridactyla
Red-legged kittiwake, Rissa brevirostris
Ivory gull, Pagophila eburnea
Sabine's gull, Xema sabini
Bonaparte's gull, Chroicocephalus philadelphia
Black-headed gull, Chroicocephalus ridibundus (R)
Little gull, Hydrocoleus minutus (C)
Ross's gull, Rhodostethia rosea
Laughing gull, Leucophaeus atricilla (C)
Franklin's gull, Leucophaeus pipixcan (R)
Pallas's gull, Ichthyaetus ichthyaetus (A)
Black-tailed gull, Larus crassirostris (C)
Heermann's gull, Larus heermanni (C)
Common gull, Larus canus (R)
Short-billed gull, Larus brachyrhynchus
Ring-billed gull, Larus delawarensis (R)
Western gull, Larus occidentalis (C)
California gull, Larus californicus
Herring gull, Larus argentatus
Iceland gull, Larus glaucoides
Lesser black-backed gull, Larus fuscus (C)
Slaty-backed gull, Larus schistisagus
Glaucous-winged gull, Larus glaucescens
Glaucous gull, Larus hyperboreus
Great black-backed gull, Larus marinus (C)
Sooty tern, Onychoprion fuscatus (A)
Aleutian tern, Onychoprion aleuticus
Little tern/Least tern, Sternula albifrons/antillarum (U)
Caspian tern, Hydroprogne caspia (R)
Black tern, Chlidonias niger (C)
White-winged tern, Chlidonias leucopterus (C)
Common tern, Sterna hirundo (C)
Arctic tern, Sterna paradisaea
Sandwich tern, Thalasseus sandvicensis (A)

Penguins
Order: SphenisciformesFamily: Spheniscidae

The penguins are a group of aquatic, flightless birds living almost exclusively in the Southern Hemisphere. Most penguins feed on krill, fish, squid, and other forms of sealife caught while swimming underwater.

Humboldt penguin, Spheniscus humboldti (A)

Loons
Order: GaviiformesFamily: Gaviidae

Loons are aquatic birds the size of a large duck, to which they are unrelated. Their plumage is largely gray or black, and they have spear-shaped bills. Loons swim well and fly adequately, but are almost hopeless on land, because their legs are placed towards the rear of the body.

Red-throated loon, Gavia stellata
Arctic loon, Gavia arctica (R)
Pacific loon, Gavia pacifica
Common loon, Gavia immer
Yellow-billed loon, Gavia adamsii

Albatrosses
Order: ProcellariiformesFamily: Diomedeidae

The albatrosses are amongst the largest of flying birds, and the great albatrosses from the genus Diomedea have the largest wingspans of any extant birds.

Salvin's albatross, Thalassarche salvini (A)
Laysan albatross, Phoebastria immutabilis
Black-footed albatross, Phoebastria nigripes
Short-tailed albatross, Phoebastria albatrus (R)

Northern storm-petrels
Order: ProcellariiformesFamily: Hydrobatidae

The storm-petrels are the smallest seabirds, relatives of the petrels, feeding on planktonic crustaceans and small fish picked from the surface, typically while hovering. The flight is fluttering and sometimes bat-like.

Fork-tailed storm-petrel, Hydrobates furcatus
Swinhoe's storm-petrel, Hydrobates monorhis (U)
Leach's storm-petrel, Hydrobates leucorhous

Shearwaters and petrels

Order: ProcellariiformesFamily: Procellariidae

The procellariids are the main group of medium-sized "true petrels", characterized by united nostrils with medium septum and a long outer functional primary.

Northern fulmar, Fulmarus glacialis
Providence petrel, Pterodroma solandri (A)
Murphy's petrel, Pterodroma ultima (U)
Mottled petrel, Pterodroma inexpectata
Cook's petrel, Pterodroma cookii (A)
Buller's shearwater, Ardenna bulleri
Short-tailed shearwater, Ardenna tenuirostris
Sooty shearwater, Ardenna griseus
Great shearwater, Ardenna gravis (C)
Pink-footed shearwater, Ardenna creatopus (R)
Flesh-footed shearwater, Ardenna carneipes (R)
Manx shearwater, Puffinus puffinus (R)

Frigatebirds
Order: SuliformesFamily: Fregatidae

Frigatebirds are large seabirds usually found over tropical oceans. They are large, black, or black-and-white, with long wings and deeply forked tails. The males have colored inflatable throat pouches. They do not swim or walk and cannot take off from a flat surface. Having the largest wingspan-to-body-weight ratio of any bird, they are essentially aerial, able to stay aloft for more than a week.

Magnificent frigatebird, Fregata magnificens (A)

Boobies and gannets
Order: SuliformesFamily: Sulidae

The sulids comprise the gannets and boobies. Both groups are medium to large coastal seabirds that plunge-dive for fish.

Nazca booby, Sula granti (A)
Brown booby, Sula leucogaster (C)
Red-footed booby, Sula sula (C)
Northern gannet, Morus bassanus (U)

Cormorants and shags
Order: SuliformesFamily: Phalacrocoracidae

Cormorants are medium-to-large aquatic birds, usually with mainly dark plumage and areas of colored skin on the face. The bill is long, thin, and sharply hooked. Their feet are four-toed and webbed.

Brandt's cormorant, Urile penicillatus (R)
Red-faced cormorant, Urile urile
Pelagic cormorant, Urile pelagicus
Double-crested cormorant, Nannopterum auritum

Pelicans
Order: PelecaniformesFamily: Pelecanidae

Pelicans are very large water birds with a distinctive pouch under their beak. Like other birds in the order Pelecaniformes, they have four webbed toes.

American white pelican, Pelecanus erythrorhynchos (A)
Brown pelican, Pelecanus occidentalis (C)

Herons, egrets, and bitterns
Order: PelecaniformesFamily: Ardeidae

The family Ardeidae contains the herons, egrets, and bitterns. Herons and egrets are medium to large wading birds with long necks and legs. Bitterns tend to be shorter necked and more secretive. Members of Ardeidae fly with their necks retracted, unlike other long-necked birds such as storks, ibises, and spoonbills.

American bittern, Botaurus lentiginosus (C)
Eurasian bittern, Botaurus stellaris (U) (This species is not on the AOS Check-list)
Yellow bittern, Ixobrychus sinensis (A)
Great blue heron, Ardea herodias
Gray heron, Ardea cinerea (C)
Great egret, Ardea alba (C)
Intermediate egret, Ardea intermedia (A)
Chinese egret, Egretta eulophotes (A)
Little egret, Egretta garzetta (A)
Snowy egret, Egretta thula (U)
Tricolored heron, Egretta tricolor (A)
Cattle egret, Bubulcus ibis (C)
Chinese pond-heron, Ardeola bacchus (C)
Green heron, Butorides virescens (A)
Black-crowned night-heron, Nycticorax nycticorax (C)

Ibises and spoonbills
Order: PelecaniformesFamily: Threskiornithidae

The family Threskiornithidae includes the ibises and spoonbills. They have long, broad wings. Their bodies are elongated, the neck more so, with long legs. The bill is also long, curved downward in the ibises, straight and markedly flattened in the spoonbills.

White-faced ibis, Plegadis chihi (A)

New World vultures
Order: CathartiformesFamily: Cathartidae

The New World vultures are not closely related to Old World vultures, but superficially resemble them because of convergent evolution. Like the Old World vultures, they are scavengers, however, unlike Old World vultures, which find carcasses by sight, New World vultures have a good sense of smell with which they locate carcasses.

Turkey vulture, Cathartes aura (C)

Osprey
Order: AccipitriformesFamily: Pandionidae

Pandionidae is a monotypic family of fish-eating birds of prey.  Its single species possesses a very large and powerful hooked beak, strong legs, strong talons, and keen eyesight.

Osprey, Pandion haliaetus

Hawks, eagles, and kites
Order: AccipitriformesFamily: Accipitridae

Accipitridae is a family of birds of prey, which includes hawks, eagles, kites, harriers, and Old World vultures. These birds have very large powerful hooked beaks for tearing flesh from their prey, strong legs, powerful talons, and keen eyesight.

Golden eagle, Aquila chrysaetos
Northern harrier, Circus hudsonius
Chinese sparrowhawk, Accipiter soloensis (U)
Eurasian sparrowhawk, Accipiter nisus (U) (This species is not on the AOS Check-list)
Sharp-shinned hawk, Accipiter striatus
Cooper's hawk, Accipiter cooperii (U)
Northern goshawk, Accipiter gentilis
Black kite, Milvus migrans (A)
Bald eagle, Haliaeetus leucocephalus
White-tailed eagle, Haliaeetus albicilla (C)
Steller's sea-eagle, Haliaeetus pelagicus (C)
Swainson's hawk, Buteo swainsoni (R)
Red-tailed hawk, Buteo jamaicensis
Rough-legged hawk, Buteo lagopus
Long-legged buzzard, Buteo rufinus (A)

Owls
Order: StrigiformesFamily: Strigidae

Typical owls are small to large solitary nocturnal birds of prey. They have large forward-facing eyes and ears, a hawk-like beak, and a conspicuous circle of feathers around each eye called a facial disk.

Oriental scops-owl, Otus sunia (A)
Western screech-owl, Megascops kennicottii (R)
Great horned owl, Bubo virginianus
Snowy owl, Bubo scandiacus
Northern hawk owl, Surnia ulula
Northern pygmy-owl, Glaucidium gnoma (R)
Barred owl, Strix varia
Great gray owl, Strix nebulosa
Long-eared owl, Asio otus (C)
Short-eared owl, Asio flammeus
Boreal owl, Aegolius funereus
Northern saw-whet owl, Aegolius acadicus
Northern boobook, Ninox japonica (A)

Hoopoes
Order: UpupiformesFamily: Upupidae

This black, white and pink bird is quite unmistakable, especially in its erratic flight, which is like that of a giant butterfly. It is the only member of its family. The song is a trisyllabic oop-oop-oop, which gives rise to its English and scientific names.

Eurasian hoopoe, Upupa epops (A)

Kingfishers
Order: CoraciiformesFamily: Alcedinidae

Kingfishers are medium-sized birds with large heads, long, pointed bills, short legs, and stubby tails.

Belted kingfisher, Megaceryle alcyon

Woodpeckers
Order: PiciformesFamily: Picidae

Woodpeckers are small to medium-sized birds with chisel-like beaks, short legs, stiff tails, and long tongues used for capturing insects. Some species have feet with two toes pointing forward and two backward, while several species have only three toes. Many woodpeckers have the habit of tapping noisily on tree trunks with their beaks.

Eurasian wryneck, Jynx torquilla (C)
Lewis's woodpecker, Melanerpes lewis (A)
Yellow-bellied sapsucker, Sphyrapicus varius (R)
Red-breasted sapsucker, Sphyrapicus ruber
American three-toed woodpecker, Picoides dorsalis
Black-backed woodpecker, Picoides arcticus
Great spotted woodpecker, Dendrocopos major (C)
Downy woodpecker, Dryobates pubescens
Hairy woodpecker, Dryobates villosus
Northern flicker, Colaptes auratus
Pileated woodpecker, Dryocopus pileatus (U)

Falcons and caracaras
Order: FalconiformesFamily: Falconidae

Falconidae is a family of diurnal birds of prey, notably the falcons and caracaras. They differ from hawks, eagles, and kites in that they kill with their beaks instead of their talons.

Eurasian kestrel, Falco tinnunculus (C)
American kestrel, Falco sparverius
Merlin, Falco columbarius
Eurasian hobby, Falco subbuteo (C)
Gyrfalcon, Falco rusticolus
Peregrine falcon, Falco peregrinus

Tyrant flycatchers
Order: PasseriformesFamily: Tyrannidae

Tyrant flycatchers are Passerine birds which occur throughout North and South America. They superficially resemble the Old World flycatchers, but are more robust and have stronger bills. They do not have the sophisticated vocal capabilities of the songbirds. Most, but not all, are rather plain. As the name implies, most are insectivorous.

Ash-throated flycatcher, Myiarchus cinerascens (A)
Great crested flycatcher, Myiarchus crinitus (C)
Tropical kingbird, Tyrannus melancholicus (C)
Western kingbird, Tyrannus verticalis (C)
Eastern kingbird, Tyrannus tyrannus (C)
Scissor-tailed flycatcher, Tyrannus forficatus (C)
Olive-sided flycatcher, Contopus cooperi
Western wood-pewee, Contopus sordidulus
Yellow-bellied flycatcher, Empidonax flaviventris (R)
Alder flycatcher, Empidonax alnorum
Willow flycatcher, Empidonax traillii (C)
Least flycatcher, Empidonax minimus (R)
Hammond's flycatcher, Empidonax hammondii
Dusky flycatcher, Empidonax oberholseri (C)
Pacific-slope flycatcher, Empidonax difficilis
Black phoebe, Sayornis nigricans (A)
Eastern phoebe, Sayornis phoebe (C)
Say's phoebe, Sayornis saya

Vireos, shrike-babblers, and erpornis
Order: PasseriformesFamily: Vireonidae

The vireos are a group of small to medium-sized passerine birds. They are typically greenish in color and resemble wood warblers apart from their heavier bills.

Cassin's vireo, Vireo cassinii (R)
Blue-headed vireo, Vireo solitarius (A)
Philadelphia vireo, Vireo philadelphicus (C)
Warbling vireo, Vireo gilvus
Red-eyed vireo, Vireo olivaceus (C)

Shrikes
Order: PasseriformesFamily: Laniidae

Shrikes are passerine birds known for their habit of catching other birds and small animals and impaling the uneaten portions of their bodies on thorns. A shrike's beak is hooked, like that of a typical bird of prey.

Brown shrike, Lanius cristatus (C)
Red-backed shrike, Lanius collurio (A)
Northern shrike, Lanius borealis

Crows, jays, and magpies
Order: PasseriformesFamily: Corvidae

The family Corvidae includes crows, ravens, jays, choughs, magpies, treepies, nutcrackers, and ground jays. Corvids are above average in size among the Passeriformes, and some of the larger species show high levels of intelligence.

Canada jay, Perisoreus canadensis
Steller's jay, Cyanocitta stelleri
Clark's nutcracker, Nucifraga columbiana (C)
Black-billed magpie, Pica hudsonia
American crow, Corvus brachyrhynchos
Common raven, Corvus corax

Tits, chickadees, and titmice
Order: PasseriformesFamily: Paridae

The Paridae are mainly small stocky woodland species with short stout bills. Some have crests. They are adaptable birds, with a mixed diet including seeds and insects.

Black-capped chickadee, Poecile atricapilla
Mountain chickadee, Poecile gambeli (C)
Chestnut-backed chickadee, Poecile rufescens
Boreal chickadee, Poecile hudsonica
Gray-headed chickadee, Poecile cinctus
Great tit, Parus major (U) (This species is not on the AOS Check-list)

Larks
Order: PasseriformesFamily: Alaudidae

Larks are small terrestrial birds with often extravagant songs and display flights. Most larks are fairly dull in appearance. Their food is insects and seeds.

Eurasian skylark, Alauda arvensis (R)
Horned lark, Eremophila alpestris

Reed warblers and allies
Order: PasseriformesFamily: Acrocephalidae

The members of this family are usually rather large for "warblers". Most are rather plain olivaceous brown above with much yellow to beige below. They are usually found in open woodland, reedbeds, or tall grass. The family occurs mostly in southern to western Eurasia and surroundings, but also ranges far into the Pacific, with some species in Africa.

Thick-billed warbler, Arundinax aedon (A)
Sedge warbler, Acrocephalus schoenobaenus (A)
Blyth's reed warbler, Acrocephalus dumetorum (A)

Grassbirds and allies
Order: PasseriformesFamily: Locustellidae

Locustellidae are a family of small insectivorous songbirds found mainly in Eurasia, Africa, and the Australian region. They are smallish birds with tails that are usually long and pointed, and tend to be drab brownish or buffy all over.

Pallas's grasshopper warbler, Helopsaltes certhiola (A)
Middendorff's grasshopper warbler, Helosaltes ochotensis (C)
Lanceolated warbler, Locustella lanceolata (C)
River warbler, Locustella fluviatilis (A)

Swallows
Order: PasseriformesFamily: Hirundinidae

The family Hirundinidae is a group of passerines characterized by their adaptation to aerial feeding. These adaptations include a slender streamlined body, long pointed wings, and short bills with a wide gape. The feet are adapted to perching rather than walking, and the front toes are partially joined at the base.

Bank swallow, Riparia riparia
Tree swallow, Tachycineta bicolor
Violet-green swallow, Tachycineta thalassina
Northern rough-winged swallow, Stelgidopteryx serripennis (R)
Purple martin, Progne subis (C)
Barn swallow, Hirundo rustica
Cliff swallow, Petrochelidon pyrrhonota
Common house-martin, Delichon urbicum (C)

Leaf warblers
Order: PasseriformesFamily: Phylloscopidae

Leaf warblers are a family of small insectivorous birds found mostly in Eurasia and ranging into Wallacea and Africa. The Arctic warbler breeds east into Alaska. The species are of various sizes, often green-plumaged above and yellow below, or more subdued with grayish-green to grayish-brown colors.

Willow warbler, Phylloscopus trochilus (C)
Common chiffchaff, Phylloscopus collybita (C)
Wood warbler, Phylloscopus sibilatrix (C)
Dusky warbler, Phylloscopus fuscatus (C)
Pallas's leaf warbler, Phylloscopus proregulus (A)
Yellow-browed warbler, Phylloscopus inornatus (C)
Arctic warbler, Phylloscopus borealis
Kamchatka leaf warbler, Phylloscopus examinandus (C)

Sylviid Warblers, parrotbills, and allies
Order: PasseriformesFamily: Sylviidae

The family Sylviidae is a group of small insectivorous passerine birds. They mainly occur as breeding species, as the common name implies, in Europe, Asia, and, to a lesser extent, Africa. Most are of generally undistinguished appearance, but many have distinctive songs.

Lesser whitethroat, Sylvia curruca (A)

Kinglets
Order: PasseriformesFamily: Regulidae

The kinglets are a small family of birds which resemble the titmice. They are very small insectivorous birds. The adults have colored crowns, giving rise to their names.

Ruby-crowned kinglet, Corthylio calendula
Golden-crowned kinglet, Regulus satrapa

Waxwings
Order: PasseriformesFamily: Bombycillidae

The waxwings are a group of birds with soft silky plumage and unique red tips to some of the wing feathers. In the Bohemian and cedar waxwings, these tips look like sealing wax and give the group its name. These are arboreal birds of northern forests. They live on insects in summer and berries in winter.

Bohemian waxwing, Bombycilla garrulus
Cedar waxwing, Bombycilla cedrorum

Nuthatches
Order: PasseriformesFamily: Sittidae

Nuthatches are small woodland birds. They have the unusual ability to climb down trees head first, unlike other birds which can only go upwards. Nuthatches have big heads, short tails, and powerful bills and feet.

Red-breasted nuthatch, Sitta canadensis

Treecreepers
Order: PasseriformesFamily: Certhiidae

Treecreepers are small woodland birds, brown above and white below. They have thin pointed down-curved bills, which they use to extricate insects from bark. They have stiff tail feathers, like woodpeckers, which they use to support themselves on vertical trees.

Brown creeper, Certhia americana

Wrens
Order: PasseriformesFamily: Troglodytidae

Wrens are small and inconspicuous birds, except for their loud songs. They have short wings and thin down-turned bills. Several species often hold their tails upright.

Rock wren, Salpinctes obsoletus (A)
Pacific wren, Troglodytes pacificus
Marsh wren, Cistothorus palustris (A)

Mockingbirds and thrashers
Order: PasseriformesFamily: Mimidae

The mimids are a family of passerine birds which includes thrashers, mockingbirds, tremblers, and the New World catbirds. These birds are notable for their vocalization, especially their remarkable ability to mimic a wide variety of birds and other sounds heard outdoors. The species tend towards dull grays and browns in their appearance.

Gray catbird, Dumetella carolinensis (C)
Brown thrasher, Toxostoma rufum (C)
Northern mockingbird, Mimus polyglottos (C)

Starlings
Order: PasseriformesFamily: Sturnidae

Starlings are small to medium-sized passerine birds. They are medium-sized passerines with strong feet. Their flight is strong and direct and they are very gregarious. Their preferred habitat is fairly open country, and they eat insects and fruit. Plumage is typically dark with a metallic sheen.

European starling, Sturnus vulgaris (Introduced to North America)

Dippers
Order: PasseriformesFamily: Cinclidae

Dippers are small, stout, birds that feed in cold, fast moving streams.

American dipper, Cinclus mexicanus

Thrushes and allies
Order: PasseriformesFamily: Turdidae

The thrushes are a group of passerine birds that occur mainly but not exclusively in the Old World. They are plump, soft plumaged, small to medium-sized insectivores or sometimes omnivores, often feeding on the ground. Many have attractive songs.

Mountain bluebird, Sialia currucoides (R)
Townsend's solitaire, Myadestes townsendi
Veery, Catharus fuscescens (C)
Gray-cheeked thrush, Catharus minimus
Swainson's thrush, Catharus ustulatus
Hermit thrush, Catharus guttatus
Wood thrush, Hylocichla mustelina (A)
Eyebrowed thrush, Turdus obscurus (R)
Dusky thrush, Turdus eunomus (C)
Naumann's thrush, Turdus naumanni (U)
Fieldfare, Turdus pilaris (A)
Redwing, Turdus iliacus (A)
Song thrush, Turdys philomelos (A)
American robin, Turdus migratorius
Varied thrush, Ixoreus naevius

Old World flycatchers
Order: PasseriformesFamily: Muscicapidae

This a large family of small passerine birds restricted to the Old World. Most of the species below only occur in North America as vagrants. The appearance of these birds is highly varied, but they mostly have weak songs and harsh calls.

Gray-streaked flycatcher, Muscicapa griseisticta (C)
Asian brown flycatcher, Muscicapa dauurica (C)
Spotted flycatcher, Muscicapa striata (A)
Dark-sided flycatcher, Muscicapa sibirica (C)
Siberian blue robin, Larvivora cyane (A)
Rufous-tailed robin, Larvivora sibilans (C)
Bluethroat, Cyanecula svecica
Siberian rubythroat, Calliope calliope (R)
Red-flanked bluetail, Tarsiger cyanurus (C)
Narcissus flycatcher, Ficedula narcissina (A)
Mugimaki flycatcher, Ficedula mugimaki (U)
Taiga flycatcher, Ficedula albicilla (C)
Common redstart, Phoenicurus phoenicurus (A)
Stonechat, Saxicola maurus (C)
Rufous-tailed rock-thrush, Monticola saxatilis (A)
Northern wheatear, Oenanthe oenanthe
Pied wheatear, Oenanthe pleschanka (A)

Accentors
Order: PasseriformesFamily: Prunellidae

The accentors are small, fairly drab birds with thin sharp bills superficially similar, but unrelated to, sparrows. They are endemic to the Palearctic and only appear in North America as a vagrant.

Siberian accentor, Prunella montanella (C)

Old World sparrows
Order: PasseriformesFamily: Passeridae

Old World sparrows are small passerine birds. In general, sparrows tend to be small plump brownish or grayish birds with short tails and short powerful beaks. Sparrows are seed eaters, but they also consume small insects.

House sparrow, Passer domesticus (C) (Introduced to North America)

Wagtails and pipits
Order: PasseriformesFamily: Motacillidae

Motacillidae is a family of small passerine birds with medium to long tails. They include the wagtails, longclaws, and pipits. They are slender ground-feeding insectivores of open country.

Eastern yellow wagtail, Motacilla tschutschensis
Gray wagtail, Motacilla cinerea (C)
White wagtail, Motacilla alba (R)
Tree pipit, Anthus trivialis (C)
Olive-backed pipit, Anthus hodgsoni (C)
Pechora pipit, Anthus gustavi (C)
Red-throated pipit, Anthus cervinus
American pipit, Anthus rubescens

Finches, euphonias, and allies
Order: PasseriformesFamily: Fringillidae

Finches are seed-eating passerine birds, that are small to moderately large and have a strong beak, usually conical and in some species very large. All have twelve tail feathers and nine primaries. These birds have a bouncing flight with alternating bouts of flapping and gliding on closed wings, and most sing well.

Brambling, Fringilla montifringilla
Evening grosbeak, Coccothraustes vespertinus (C)
Hawfinch, Coccothraustes coccothraustes (C)
Common rosefinch, Carpodacus erythrinus (C)
Pallas's rosefinch, Carpodacus roseus (A)
Pine grosbeak, Pinicola enucleator
Eurasian bullfinch, Pyrrhula pyrrhula (C)
Asian rosy-finch, Leucosticte tephrocotis (A)
Gray-crowned rosy-finch, Leucosticte tephrocotis
House finch, Haemorhous mexicanus (C)
Purple finch, Haemorhous purpureus (R)
Cassin's finch, Haemorhous cassinii (C)
Oriental greenfinch, Chloris sinica (C)
Common redpoll, Acanthis flammea
Hoary redpoll, Acanthis hornemanni
Red crossbill, Loxia curvirostra
White-winged crossbill, Loxia leucoptera
Eurasian siskin, Spinus spinus (C)
Pine siskin, Spinus pinus
American goldfinch, Spinus tristis (C)

Longspurs and snow buntings
Order: PasseriformesFamily: Calcariidae

The Calcariidae are a group of passerine birds that had been traditionally grouped with the New World sparrows, but differ in a number of respects and are usually found in open grassy areas.

Lapland longspur, Calcarius lapponicus
Chestnut-collared longspur, Calcarius ornatus (U)
Smith's longspur, Calcarius pictus
Snow bunting, Plectrophenax nivalis
McKay's bunting, Plectrophenax hyperboreus (En)

Old World buntings
Order: PasseriformesFamily: Emberizidae

Emberizidae is a family of passerine birds containing a single genus. Until 2017, the New World sparrows (Passerellidae) were also considered part of this family.

Pine bunting, Emberiza leucocephalos (C)
Yellow-browed bunting, Emberiza chrysophrys (A)
Little bunting, Emberiza pusilla (C)
Rustic bunting, Emberiza rustica (R)
Yellow-throated bunting, Emberiza elegans (A)
Yellow-breasted bunting, Emberiza aureola (C)
Gray bunting, Emberiza variabilis (C)
Pallas's bunting, Emberiza pallasi (C)
Reed bunting. Emberiza schoeniclus (C)

New World sparrows
Order: PasseriformesFamily: Passerellidae

Until 2017, these species were considered part of the family Emberizidae. Most of the species are known as sparrows, but these birds are not closely related to the Old World sparrows which are in the family Passeridae. Many of these have distinctive head patterns.

Lark sparrow, Chondestes grammacus (C)
Chipping sparrow, Spizella passerina
Clay-colored sparrow, Spizella pallida (C)
Brewer's sparrow, Spizella breweri (R)
Fox sparrow, Passerella iliaca
American tree sparrow, Spizelloides arborea
Dark-eyed junco, Junco hyemalis
White-crowned sparrow, Zonotrichia leucophrys
Golden-crowned sparrow, Zonotrichia atricapilla
Harris's sparrow, Zonotrichia querula (C)
White-throated sparrow, Zonotrichia albicollis  (R)
Vesper sparrow, Pooecetes gramineus (A)
LeConte's sparrow, Ammospiza leconteii (A)
Savannah sparrow, Passerculus sandwichensis
Song sparrow, Melospiza melodia
Lincoln's sparrow, Melospiza lincolnii
Swamp sparrow, Melospiza georgiana (R)
Spotted towhee, Pipilo maculatus (C)

Troupials and allies
Order: PasseriformesFamily: Icteridae

The icterids are a group of small to medium-sized, often colorful passerine birds restricted to the New World and include the grackles, New World blackbirds, and New World orioles. Most species have black as a predominant plumage color, often enlivened by yellow, orange, or red.

Yellow-headed blackbird, Xanthocephalus xanthocephalus (C)
Bobolink, Dolichonyx oryzivorus (C)
Western meadowlark, Sturnella neglecta (C)
Orchard oriole, Icterus spurius (A)
Hooded oriole, Icterus cucullatus (A)
Bullock's oriole, Icterus bullockii (C)
Red-winged blackbird, Agelaius phoeniceus
Brown-headed cowbird, Molothrus ater (R)
Rusty blackbird, Euphagus carolinus
Brewer's blackbird, Euphagus cyanocephalus (C)
Common grackle, Quiscalus quiscula (C)

New World warblers
Order: PasseriformesFamily: Parulidae

The wood-warblers are a group of small often colorful passerine birds restricted to the New World. Most are arboreal, but some like the ovenbird and the two waterthrushes are more terrestrial. Most members of this family are insectivores.

Ovenbird, Seiurus aurocapilla (C)
Northern waterthrush, Parkesia noveboracensis
Black-and-white warbler, Mniotilta varia (C)
Tennessee warbler, Leiothlypis peregrina (R)
Orange-crowned warbler, Leiothlypis celata
Nashville warbler, Leiothlypis ruficapilla (C)
MacGillivray's warbler, Geothlypis tolmiei
Mourning warbler, Geothlypis philadelphia (C)
Kentucky warbler, Geothlypis formosa (U)
Common yellowthroat, Geothlypis trichas
American redstart, Setophaga ruticilla
Cape May warbler, Setophaga tigrina (C)
Northern parula, Setophaga americana (A)
Magnolia warbler, Setophaga magnolia (C)
Bay-breasted warbler, Setophaga castanea (A)
Yellow warbler, Setophaga petechia
Chestnut-sided warbler, Setophaga pensylvanica (C)
Blackpoll warbler, Setophaga striata
Black-throated blue warbler, Setophaga caerulescens (A)
Palm warbler, Setophaga palmarum (R)
Yellow-rumped warbler, Setophaga coronata
Yellow-throated warbler, Setophaga dominica (A)
Prairie warbler, Setophaga discolor (A)
Black-throated gray warbler, Setophaga nigrescens (C)
Townsend's warbler, Setophaga townsendi
Hermit warbler, Setophaga occidentalis (U)
Black-throated green warbler, Setophaga virens (A)
Canada warbler, Cardellina canadensis (A)
Wilson's warbler, Cardellina pusilla

Cardinals and allies
Order: PasseriformesFamily: Cardinalidae

The cardinals are a family of robust seed-eating birds with strong bills. They are typically associated with open woodland. The sexes usually have distinct plumages.

Scarlet tanager, Piranga olivacea (A)
Western tanager, Piranga ludoviciana
Rose-breasted grosbeak, Pheucticus ludovicianus (C)
Black-headed grosbeak, Pheucticus melanocephalus (R)
Blue grosbeak, Passerina caerulea (A)
Lazuli bunting, Passerina amoena (C)
Indigo bunting, Passerina cyanea (C)
Dickcissel, Spiza americana (A)

References

See also
List of birds of Denali National Park and Preserve
List of birds of Kenai Fjords National Park
List of birds of the Aleutian Islands
List of birds
Lists of birds by region
List of birds of North America

Alaska
Lists of fauna of Alaska